Aakash Talwar (born 9 October 1992) is an Indian television actor. Since career beginnings in 2014, he has been a part of over 30 TV shows.

He made his television debut with Pavitra Bandhan, but gained a breakthrough playing Varun Verma in Kaisi Yeh Yaariaan. He rise to fame with the lead role of Kabir Kapoor in Mastaangi and further appeared in serials like Thapki Pyar Ki, Ichhapyaari Naagin, Savitri Devi and Daayan. From 2020 to 2021, Talwar achieved huge recognization with his grey-shaded turned negative role of Daljeet Singh in Colors TV's fourth longest running TV soap opera Shakti and was also noticed in Colors TV's other shows Naagin 5 as Tapish Singhania and Molkki as Arjun Bajwa. He lastly did a special appearance in Colors TV's Fanaa: Ishq Mein Marjawan as Rajiv.

Television

References

1992 births
Living people
Indian male television actors
Punjabi people
Male actors from Amritsar